Bonnie Titcomb Lewis is an American politician from Maine. A Democrat from Casco, Maine, Lewis served 6 years in the Maine Senate (1988-1994). Lewis lost the 1994 Democratic primary for U.S. Congress to Dennis L. Dutremble of Biddeford.

In 2014, Titcomb Lewis, now a resident of Raymond, Maine is running for District 67 in the Maine House of Representatives.

Titcomb Lewis graduated from the University of Southern Maine with a B.S. in English and History.

References

Year of birth missing (living people)
Living people
People from Casco, Maine
People from Raymond, Maine
Democratic Party Maine state senators
Women state legislators in Maine
University of Southern Maine alumni
21st-century American women